Silviu Gabriel Pană (born 24 September 1991 in Bucharest) is a Romanian footballer who plays as a midfielder for Liga II club Concordia Chiajna.

First match in Liga I was played for Concordia Chiajna, against Sportul Studențesc. His older brother is Sorin Pană.

Club career

Pandurii Târgu Jiu
On 20 June 2014, Pandurii Târgu Jiu announced the signing of Pană on a one-year loan deal with an option to buy. On 19 July 2014, Pandurii Târgu Jiu terminated the loan of Pană just a month after he was loaned because Pandurii Târgu Jiu had too many midfielders in the team.

Turris Turnu Măgurele
On 21 June 2019, Pană joined newly promoted Liga II club Turris Turnu Măgurele.

Petrolul Ploiești
On 16 December 2020, Pană joined Petrolul Ploiești on a half-year contract.

Honours
Dunărea Călărași
Liga II: 2017–18

Petrolul Ploiești
Liga II: 2021–22

References

External links
 
 

1981 births
Footballers from Bucharest
Living people
Romania under-21 international footballers
Romanian footballers
Association football midfielders
Liga I players
Liga II players
CS Concordia Chiajna players
AFC Săgeata Năvodari players
FC Viitorul Constanța players
FC Brașov (1936) players
FC Olimpia Satu Mare players
FC Dunărea Călărași players
AFC Turris-Oltul Turnu Măgurele players
FC Petrolul Ploiești players
SSU Politehnica Timișoara players